André Aldenhov (born 26 September 1971) is a Swedish weightlifter. He competed in the men's lightweight event at the 1996 Summer Olympics.

References

External links
 

1971 births
Living people
Swedish male weightlifters
Olympic weightlifters of Sweden
Weightlifters at the 1996 Summer Olympics
People from Trelleborg
Sportspeople from Skåne County
20th-century Swedish people